"Punching in a Dream" is a song by New Zealand indie electronic band The Naked and Famous from their debut studio album, Passive Me, Aggressive You (2010). It was released on 23 August 2010 as the album's third single. The song debuted and peaked at number 11 on the New Zealand chart.

In popular culture
The single was featured in the episodes "Kill or Be Killed" and "Our Town" of The Vampire Diaries and in 2011 comedy Getting That Girl.  It also appears on the soundtrack for EA Sports game, FIFA 12 and season 1 episode 7 of the show World of Jenks. The song is frequently used as the pre-match tune on Foxsports A-League coverage.  It can also be heard in a car commercial for the 2012 GMC Terrain. The song can also be heard briefly in the short film Kony 2012. The song was used on the British series Made in Chelsea in 2011, and also in the 2012 film Pitch Perfect. The song was also used in the 2012 game Forza Horizon, as part of the Horizon Pulse radio station, which only plays indie music.

The music can also be heard during the Made in Chelsea General Hospital Sketch in Series 2, Episode 2 of British sketch comedy show Watson and Oliver.

Track listings

Digital download
"Punching in a Dream" – 3:33

UK digital download
"Punching in a Dream" (Single version) – 3:34
"Punching in a Dream" (Music video) – 3:33

Digital download
"Punching in a Dream" (Single Version) – 3:34

UK limited edition 7" single
A. "Punching in a Dream" – 3:34
B. "Wild" – 3:53

Stripped version
 "Punching in a Dream" (Stripped) – 3:28

Charts

Release history

References

2010 singles
2010 songs
Fiction Records singles
The Naked and Famous songs
Polydor Records singles